= Villa Dos Trece =

Coordinates: 26°10′S 59°21′W

- Interactive map of Villa Dos Trece
- Country: Argentina
- Province: Formosa Province
- Time zone: UTC−3 (ART)

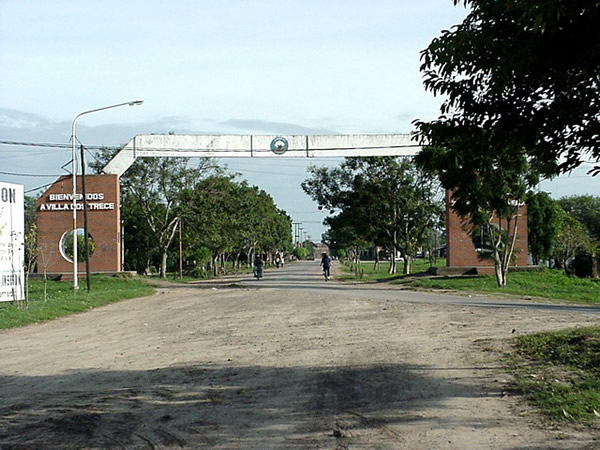
Villa Dos Trece

Villa Dos Trece is a settlement in northern Argentina. It is located in Formosa Province.
